This page is a list of popes by country of origin. They are listed in chronological order within each section.

As the office of pope has existed for almost two millennia, many of the countries of origin of popes no longer exist, and so they are grouped under their modern equivalents.

Overview
There have been 266 popes, of which:

217 from Italy 
16 from France (Pope Sylvester II, Pope Stephen IX, Pope Nicholas II, Pope Urban II, Pope Callistus II, Pope Urban IV, Pope Clement IV, Pope Innocent V, Pope Martin IV, Pope Clement V, Pope John XXII, Pope Benedict XII, Pope Clement VI, Pope Innocent VI, Pope Urban V, and Pope Gregory XI)
6 from Germany (Pope Gregory V, Pope Clement II, Pope Damasus II, Pope Leo IX, Pope Victor II, and Pope Benedict XVI)
5 from the Byzantine Empire in modern-day Syria (Pope Anicetus, Pope John V, Pope Sisinnius, Pope Constantine, and Pope Gregory III)
4 from Greece (Pope Anacletus, Pope Hyginus, Pope Eleutherius, and Pope Sixtus II)
3 from the Holy Land in modern-day Israel (Pope Peter, Pope Evaristus, and Pope Theodore I)
3 from Africa Proconsularis (Pope Victor I, Pope Miltiades, Pope Gelasius I)
2 from Dalmatia in modern-day Croatia (Pope Caius and Pope John IV)
2 from Valencia in modern-day Spain (Pope Callixtus III and Pope Alexander VI)
2 from Portugal (Pope Damasus I and Pope John XXI)
2 from Anatolia in modern-day Turkey (Pope Conon and Pope John VI)
1 from England (Pope Adrian IV)
1 from the Netherlands (Pope Adrian VI)
1 from Poland (Pope John Paul II)
1 from Argentina (Pope Francis)

Statistics table

Popes from the Roman and Byzantine Empire

Byzantine Italy
Pope Pelagius I (556–561)
Pope John III (561–574)
Pope Pelagius II (579–590)
Pope Gregory I (590–604)
Pope Sabinian (604–606)
Pope Boniface III (607)
Pope Boniface IV (608–615)
Pope Adeodatus I (615–618)
Pope Boniface V (619–625)
Pope Honorius I (625–638)
Pope Severinus (636–640)
Pope Martin I (649–653)
Pope Eugene I (654–657)
Pope Vitalian (657–672)
Pope Adeodatus II (672–676)
Pope Donus (676–678)
Pope Agatho (678–681)
Pope Leo II (682–683)
Pope Benedict I (575–579)
Pope Benedict II (684–685)
Pope Sergius I (687–701)
Pope Gregory II (715–731)
Pope Zachary (741–752)
Pope Stephen III (768–772)
Pope Stephen II (752–757)
Pope Stephen IV (816–817)

Byzantine Sicily
Pope Conon (686–687)

Greece 
Pope Telesphorus (126–137)
Pope Hyginus (c. 138 – c. 140)
Pope Eleuterus (174/175–189)
Pope Anterus (235–236)
Pope Sixtus II (257–258)
Pope Dionysius (259–268)
Pope Zosimus (417–418)
Pope John VI (701–705)
Pope John VII (705–707)

Lusitania Province
Lusitania corresponds to present-day #Portugal.
Pope Damasus I (366–384)

Roman Africa
These popes are from the Roman province of Africa, which corresponds to the coastal parts of Tunisia, Libya and Algeria.
Pope Victor I (189–199)
Pope Miltiades (311–314)
Pope Gelasius I (492–496)

Roman and Byzantine Syria
Pope Anicetus (c. 154–167)
Pope John V (685–686)
Pope Sisinnius (708)
Pope Constantine (708–715)
Pope Gregory III (731–741)

Roman Dalmatia 
Dalmatia was at the time part of the Roman and Byzantine Empires. It is now part of the modern Republic of Croatia.
Pope Caius (283–296)
Pope John IV (640–642)

Roman Galilee and Iudaea Province
Saint Peter (c. 30 – c. 67); a native of Bethsaida, in the modern Golan Heights
Pope Evaristus (c. 99 – c. 107); a native of Bethlehem, in the modern West Bank
Pope Theodore I (642–649); a native of Jerusalem

Roman Italy
Pope Linus (64/67(?)–76/79 (?))
Pope Anacletus (76/79(?)–88)
Pope Clement I (88/92–97/101)
Pope Alexander I (c.106–c.115)
Pope Sixtus I (117/119(?)–126/128(?)
Pope Pius I (c. 140 – c. 154)
Pope Soter (c. 166 – 174/175)
Pope Zephyrinus (199–217)
Pope Callixtus I (c. 217 – 222)
Pope Pontian (230–235)
Pope Urban I (222–230)
Pope Fabian (236–250)
Pope Cornelius (251–253)
Pope Lucius I (253–254)
Pope Stephen I (254–257)
Pope Felix I (269–274)
Pope Marcellinus (296–304?)
Pope Marcellus I (308–309)
Pope Sylvester I (314–335)
Pope Mark (336)
Pope Julius I (337–352)
Pope Liberius (352–366)
Pope Siricius (384–399)
Pope Anastasius I (399–401)
Pope Innocent I (401–417)
Pope Boniface I (418–422)
Pope Celestine I (422–432)
Pope Sixtus III (432–440)
Pope Leo I (440–461)
Pope Hilarius (461–468)
Pope Simplicius (468–483)
Pope Felix III (483–492)
Pope Anastasius II (396–398)
Pope Symmachus (498–514)
Pope Silverius (536–537)

Roman Sardinia
Pope Eusebius (309/310)
Pope John V (685–686)
Pope Sisinnius (708)
Pope Constantine (708–715)
Pope Gregory III (731–741)

Popes by nationality
The concept of nationality only arose during the Middle Ages.

Argentina
Pope Francis (2013–present)

England
England is part of the modern United Kingdom.
Pope Adrian IV (1154–1159)

France
French is the most common non-Italian papal ancestry. Seventeen popes have had French ancestry, all in the second half of the medieval era. The seven popes of the Avignon Papacy were French and are bolded. Since the end of the Avignon Papacy, no French person has been elected pope.

Kingdom of France (medieval)
Pope Silvester II (999–1003): Gerbert of Aurillac
Pope Urban II (1088–1099): Otho of Lagery (or Otto or Odo)
Pope Urban IV (1261–1264): Jacques Pantaléon
Pope Clement IV (1265–1268): Guy Foulques
Pope Martin IV (1281–1285): Simon de Brie
Pope Clement V (1305–1314): Bertrand de Got
Pope John XXII (1316–1334): Jacques d'Euse
Pope Benedict XII (1334–1342): Jacques Fournier
Pope Clement VI (1342–1352): Pierre Roger
Pope Innocent VI (1352–1362): Stephen Aubert
Pope Urban V (1362–1370): Guillaume de Grimoard
Pope Gregory XI (1370–1378): Pierre Roger de Beaufort

Holy Roman Empire
Pope Leo IX (1049–1054) (Alsace, Duchy of Swabia): Bruno, Count of Dagsbourg
Pope Stephen IX (1057–1058) (Duchy of Lorraine): Frederick of Lorraine
Pope Nicholas II (1059–1061) (Kingdom of Burgundy): Gerard of Burgundy
Pope Callixtus II (1119–1124) (County of Burgundy): Guido of Vienne
Pope Innocent V (1276) (Kingdom of Arles): Pierre de Tarentaise

Germany

Holy Roman Empire
Pope Gregory V (996–999) (Duchy of Saxony)
Pope Clement II (1046–1047) (Duchy of Saxony)
Pope Damasus II (1048) (Duchy of Bavaria)
Pope Victor II (1055–1057) (Duchy of Swabia)

Federal Republic of Germany
Pope Benedict XVI (2005–2013)

Italian peninsula

Ostrogothic Kingdom
Pope Hormisdas (514–523)
Pope John I (523–526)
Pope Felix IV (526–530)
Pope Boniface II (530–532)
Pope John II (533–535)
Pope Agapetus I (535–536)
Pope Vigilius (537–555)

Papal States

Pope Paul I (757–767)
Pope Adrian I (772–795)
Pope Leo III (795–816)
Pope Paschal I (817–824)
Pope Eugene II (824–827)
Pope Valentine (827)
Pope Gregory IV (827–844)
Pope Sergius II (844–847)
Pope Leo IV (847–855)
Pope Benedict III (855–858)
Pope Nicholas I (858–867)
Pope Adrian II (867–872)
Pope John VIII (872–882)
Pope Marinus I (882–884)
Pope Adrian III (884–885)
Pope Stephen V (885–891)
Pope Formosus (891–896)
Pope Boniface VI (896)
Pope Stephen VI (896–897)
Pope Romanus (897)
Pope Theodore II (897)
Pope John IX (898–900)
Pope Benedict IV (900–903)
Pope Leo V (903)

Pope Sergius III (904–911)
Pope Anastasius III (911–913)
Pope Lando (913–914)
Pope John X (914–928)
Pope Leo VI (928)
Pope Stephen VII (928–931)
Pope John XI (931–935)
Pope Leo VII (936–939)
Pope Marinus II (942–946)
Pope Agapetus II (946–955)
Pope John XII (955–964)
Pope Benedict V (964)
Pope Leo VIII (963–965)
Pope John XIII (965–972)
Pope Benedict VI (973–974)
Pope Benedict VII (974–983)
Pope John XV (985–996)
Pope John XVII (1003)
Pope John XVIII (1004–1009)
Pope Sergius IV (1009–1012)
Pope Benedict VIII (1012–1024)
Pope John XIX (1024–1032)
Pope Benedict IX (1032–1048)
Pope Sylvester III (1045)

Pope Gregory VI (1045–1046)
Pope Gregory VII (1073–1085)
Pope Victor III (1086–1087)
Pope Paschal II (1099–1118)
Pope Gelasius II (1118–1119)
Pope Honorius II (1124–1130)
Pope Innocent II (1130–1143)
Pope Celestine II (1143–1144)
Pope Lucius II (1144–1145)
Pope Eugene III (1145–1153)
Pope Anastasius IV (1153–1154)
Pope Alexander III (1159–1181)
Pope Lucius III (1181–1185)
Pope Gregory VIII (1187)
Pope Clement III (1187–1191)
Pope Celestine III (1191–1198)
Pope Innocent III (1198–1216)
Pope Honorius III (1216–1227)
Pope Gregory IX (1227–1241)
Pope Celestine IV (1241)
Pope Alexander IV (1254–1261)
Pope Gregory X (1271–1276)
Pope Nicholas III (1277–1280)
Pope Honorius IV (1285–1287)

Pope Nicholas IV (1288–1292)
Pope Celestine V (1294)
Pope Boniface VIII (1294–1303)
Pope Benedict XI (1303–1304)
Pope Urban VI (1378–1389)
Pope Boniface IX (1389–1404)
Pope Martin V (1417–1431)
Pope Nicholas V (1447–1455)
Pope Pius II (1458–1464)
Pope Paul II (1464–1471)
Pope Sixtus IV (1471–1484)
Pope Innocent VIII (1484–1492)
Pope Pius III (1503)
Pope Julius II (1503–1513)
Pope Paul III (1534–1549)
Pope Julius III (1550–1555)
Pope Marcellus II (1555)
Pope Paul IV (1555–1559)
Pope Pius IV (1559–1565)
Pope Pius V (1566–1572)
Pope Gregory XIII (1572–1585)
Pope Sixtus V (1585–1590)
Pope Urban VII (1590)
Pope Gregory XIV (1590–1591)

Pope Innocent IX (1591)
Pope Paul V (1605–1621)
Pope Gregory XV (1621–1623)
Pope Innocent X (1644–1655)
Pope Alexander VII (1655–1667)
Pope Clement IX (1667–1669)
Pope Clement X (1670–1676)
Pope Innocent XI (1676–1689)
Pope Innocent XII (1691–1700)
Pope Clement XI (1700–1721)
Pope Innocent XIII (1721–1724)
Pope Benedict XIII (1724–1730)
Pope Benedict XIV (1740–1758)
Pope Clement XIII (1758–1769)
Pope Clement XIV (1769–1774)
Pope Pius VI (1775–1799)
Pope Pius VII (1800–1823)
Pope Leo XII (1823–1829)
Pope Pius VIII (1829–1830)
Pope Gregory XVI (1831–1846)
Pope Pius IX (1846–1878)
Pope Leo XIII (1878–1903)

Italy in the Holy Roman Empire
Pope John XIV (983–984)
Pope Alexander II (1061–1073)
Pope Urban III (1185–1187)

Republic of Genoa
Pope Innocent IV (1243–1254)
Pope Adrian V (1276)
Pope Innocent VII (1404–1406)

Republic of Venice
Pope Gregory XII (1406–1415)
Pope Eugene IV (1431–1447)
Pope Alexander VIII (1689–1691)

Republic of Florence/Duchy of Florence/Grand Duchy of Tuscany
Pope Eutychian (275–283)
Pope Leo X (1513–1521)
Pope Clement VII (1523–1534)
Pope Clement VIII (1592–1605)
Pope Leo XI (1605)
Pope Urban VIII (1623–1644)
Pope Clement XII (1730–1740)

Kingdom of Italy (modern) and Italian Republic 
Pope Pius X (1903–1914)
Pope Benedict XV (1914–1922)
Pope Pius XI (1922–1939)
Pope Pius XII (1939–1958)
Pope John XXIII (1958–1963)
Pope Paul VI (1963–1978)
Pope John Paul I (1978)

Netherlands

Holy Roman Empire
Pope Adrian VI (1522–1523) (Bishopric of Utrecht)

Poland
Pope John Paul II (1978–2005)

Portugal
Pope John XXI (1276–1277) (Kingdom of Portugal)

Spain

Valencia
The Kingdom of Valencia was then part of the possessions of the Crown of Aragon; it is now part of modern Spain.
Pope Callixtus III (1455–1458)
Pope Alexander VI (1492–1503)

Bibliography 
 
 The Incredible Book of Vatican Facts and Papal Curiosities – a treasury of trivia, Gramercy Books, New York, 1998

References

External links
  at The Guardian
  * The list of popes is based on the following bibliography:
 "Crónica de los Papas": of P.G. Maxwell Stuart,
 "Vatican facts": of Nino Lo Bello,
 "Saints and Sinners": of historian Eamon Duffy
 Liber Pontificalis

 
Country